Caeté is a Brazilian municipality located in the state of Minas Gerais. The city belongs to the mesoregion Metropolitana de Belo Horizonte and to the microregion of Belo Horizonte.

The name Caeté is derived from the local term for some Marantaceae, in particular Stromanthe and Thalia.

The municipality contains a small part of the  Serra do Gandarela National Park, created in 2014.

44.9% of its population are fans of Cruzeiro while 40.2% prefer Atlético-MG.

See also
 List of municipalities in Minas Gerais

References 

Municipalities in Minas Gerais
Populated places established in the 17th century
1714 establishments in the Portuguese Empire